Taihe Subdistrict is a subdistrict in Xuyi County, Jiangsu, China. , it has three residential neighborhoods and two villages under its administration:
Neighborhoods
Taihe
Youfa
Maoying

Villages
Mangang Village
Santang Village

See also 
 List of township-level divisions of Jiangsu

References 

Township-level divisions of Jiangsu
Xuyi County